Sykes and a Big, Big Show is a British sitcom-sketch show first aired on BBC 1 in 1971. Starring Eric Sykes and Hattie Jacques, it was written by Sykes and directed by Harold Snoad and Douglas Argent. Sykes and Jacques had previously starred together in Sykes and A... (1960–65) and from 1972 to 1979 starred in Sykes.

Cast
Eric Sykes – various roles
Hattie Jacques – various roles
Ian Wallace – various roles
Philip Gilbert – various roles
Tony Melody – various roles
Michael Knowles – various roles

Plot
Sykes and a Big, Big Show features situation sketches and musical numbers, performed by the singer Ian Wallace.

Episodes
"Shipwreck" (26 February 1971)
"Concorde" (5 March 1971)
"Guest" (12 March 1971)
"Submarine" (19 March 1971)
"Western" (26 March 1971)
"Britain's First Moon Shot" (2 April 1971)

Missing episodes
Out of the six episodes, 3 episodes have been lost, the first 'Shipwreck' still exists as a b/w telerecording. The second 'Concorde' exists as a VHS copy held by the BFI (the BBC also hold a digital copy) and the third episode 'Guest' still exists on original 625 line PAL colour videotape.

References

External links 
 

1971 British television series debuts
1971 British television series endings
1970s British comedy television series
BBC television sitcoms
English-language television shows
Lost BBC episodes